Purbeck was a local government district in Dorset, England. The district was named after the Isle of Purbeck, a peninsula that forms a large proportion of the district's area. However, it extended significantly further north and west than the traditional boundary of the Isle of Purbeck which is the River Frome. The district council was based in the town of Wareham, which is itself north of the Frome.

The district was formed under the Local Government Act 1972 on 1 April 1974, from the former municipal borough of Wareham, Swanage urban district and Wareham and Purbeck Rural District.
The district and its council were abolished on 1 April 2019, together with the other four districts outside the greater Bournemouth area, to form a new Dorset unitary authority.

Its name is recorded in 948 AD as Anglo-Saxon Purbicinga, meaning "of the people of Purbic", where Purbic may be a former Celtic name, or may contain a supposed Anglo-Saxon word *pur or "male lamb".

Settlements
Settlements with a population over 2,500 are in bold.
Affpuddle, Arne
Bere Regis, Bloxworth
Chaldon Herring, Church Knowle, Coombe Keynes, Corfe Castle
East Lulworth, East Stoke
Harman's Cross
Kingston, Kimmeridge
Langton Matravers, Lytchett Matravers, Lytchett Minster
Morden, Moreton
Ridge
Steeple, Stoborough, Stoborough Green, Studland, Swanage
Turners Puddle
Wareham, West Lulworth, Winfrith Newburgh, Wool, Worgret, Worth Matravers
Upton Lytchett Minster and Upton

Places of interest
Ballard Down, Blue Pool, Brownsea Island
Chaldon Down, Chapman's Pool, Clouds Hill, Corfe Castle
Dancing Ledge, Dunshay Manor, Durdle Door, Durlston Country Park
Godlingstone Heath, Godlingstone Manor
Hambury Tout
Jurassic Coast (A World Heritage Site)
Lulworth Castle, Lulworth Cove
Kimmeridge
Nine Barrow Down
Old Harry Rocks
Poole Harbour, Purbeck Heritage Coast
Smedmore Hill, South West Coast Path, St Aldhelm's Head, Studland Bay, Swanage Railway, Swyre Head
Tyneham
Worbarrow Tout, Wareham Forest, Winspit, Wytch Farm

See also
Purbeck Marble
Purbeck Ball Clay  -  Purbeck Mineral and Mining Museum
List of churches in Purbeck
Purbeck District Council elections

References

External links
Purbeck District Council
National Coastwatch Institution St Alban's Head Website
 Links to all the Museums on the Isle of Purbeck

 
Former non-metropolitan districts
Non-metropolitan districts of Dorset
2019 disestablishments in England